Harvey Whittaker (1875 – 1937) was an English footballer who played in the Football League for Stoke.

Career
Whittaker was born in Congleton and played for local amateur side Congleton Hornets before joining Stoke in 1899. He played four matches for Stoke during the 1899–1900 season. He later played for Newcastle Town.

Career statistics

References

English footballers
Stoke City F.C. players
English Football League players
1875 births
People from Congleton
Newcastle Town F.C. players
1937 deaths
Sportspeople from Cheshire
Association football midfielders